The Pauson–Khand reaction (or PKR or PK-type reaction) is a chemical reaction described as a [2+2+1] cycloaddition between an alkyne, an alkene and carbon monoxide to form a α,β-cyclopentenone. Ihsan Ullah Khand (1935-1980) discovered the reaction around 1970, while working as a postdoctoral associate with Peter Ludwig Pauson (1925–2013) at the University of Strathclyde in Glasgow. Pauson and Khand's initial findings were intermolecular in nature, but starting a decade after the reaction's discovery, many intramolecular examples have been highlighted in both synthesis and methodology reports. This reaction was originally mediated by stoichiometric amounts of dicobalt octacarbonyl, but newer versions are both more efficient, enhancing reactivity and yield via utilizing different chiral auxiliaries for stereo induction, main group transition-metals (Ti, Mo, W, Fe, Co, Ni, Ru, Rh, Ir and Pd), and additives.

Mechanism 
While the mechanism has not yet been fully elucidated, Magnus' 1985 explanation is widely accepted for both mono- and dinuclear catalysts, and was corroborated by computational studies published by Nakamura and Yamanaka in 2001. The reaction starts with dicobalt hexacarbonyl acetylene complex. Binding of an alkene gives a metallacyclopentene complex. CO then migratorily inserts into an M-C bond. Reductive elimination deliver the cyclopentenone. Typically, the dissociation of carbon monoxide from the organometallic complex is rate limiting.

Selectivity 
With unsymmetrical alkenes or alkynes, the reaction is not very regioselective, a problem that is ameliorated in intramolecular reactions.

The reaction works with both terminal and internal alkynes although internal alkynes tend to give lower yields. The order of reactivity for the alkene is   Unsuitable alkenes are tetrasubstituted alkenes and alkenes with strongly electron withdrawing groups.  
Mono-substituted alkenes are generally directed by the sterics of the alkyne. For intermolecular Pauson-Khand, the sterically larger group on the alkyne tends to go to the C2-position. Electron-withdrawing groups on the alkyne prefer the C3-position.

Mono-substituted alkenes are difficult to discriminate between the C4- and C5-position, unless the C2-position is sterically congested or there is a chelating heteroatom on the alkene.

Intramolecular Paulson-Khand has been widely exploited in total synthesis, and is amenable to the formation of bicyclic rings (specifically 5,5- and 6,5- fused bicyclic rings), as well as more general polycyclic ring structures.  Generally, the reaction is highly syn selective about the bridgehead hydrogen and substituents on the cyclopentane.

Catalysis 
The PKR can be rendered catalytic.  Buchwald showed that titanium and nickel complexes admit such a transformation. Additionally, Negishi found that zirconium worked as well. Other metals can also be employed in these transformations.

Traditional catalytic aids such as phosphine ligands can make the cobalt complex too stable, but bulky phosphite ligands are operable. These reactions can be made enantioselective as well, with the addition of chiral ligands or auxiliaries. BINAP is commonly employed.

Additives 
Typical PKR conditions are at elevated temperatures and pressures in aromatic/hydrocarbon (benzene, toluene) or etherate (tetrahydrofuran, 1,2-dichloroethane) based solvents. These harsh conditions, may be attenuated with the addition of various additives. Many different tactics have been exploited to ameliorate these harsh conditions, making it amenable for additional functional groups, granting higher yields, shorter reaction times, and typically greater stereocontrol. Some of the different approaches are: adsorption, amine N-oxides and hydrates, and the addition of Lewis basic molecules.

Adsorption 
Adsorbing the metallic complex onto silica or alumina can enhance the rate of decarbonylative ligand exchange as exhibited in the image below. This is because the donor posits itself on a solid surface (i.e. silica). Additionally using a solid support restricts conformational movement (rotamer effect).

Amine N-oxides and hydrates 
The two most common amine N-oxides are N-methylmorpholine N-oxide (NMO) and trimethylamine N-oxide (TMANO). It is believed that these additives remove carbon monoxide ligands via nucleophilic attack of the N-oxide onto the CO carbonyl, oxidizing the CO into CO2, and generating an unsaturated organometallic complex. As a result, this renders the first step of the mechanism irreversible, and allows for more mild conditions. Hydrates of the aforementioned amine N-oxides have also been utilized.

Schreiber utilized an amine N-oxide additive for the total synthesis of epoxydictymene. The N-oxide additive, while lower yielding, gave a d.r. of 11:1 in favor of the desired diastereomer (indicated at the red hydrogen), where as other conditions like thermal and ultrasonic were less effective.

Lewis basic additives 
The most common Lewis basic additive is sulfur containing compounds like n-BuSMe. Lewis basic additives are believed to accelerate the decarbonylative ligand exchange process. However, an alternative view posited in 2005, claims that the Lewis basicity makes olefin insertion an irreversible step in the mechanistic pathway. However, these sulfur adducts are typically hard to handle and smelly, so recently, n-dodecyl methyl sulfide (DodSMe) has been utilized as an alternative Lewis basic source. Another example is with TMTU (tetramethylthiourea). Additionally, Chiral N-oxides have been used for enantioinduction.

Miscellaneous

Gas Free PKR 
Recently, several groups have published work avoiding the use of toxic carbon monoxide, and instead generate the cyclopentenone carbonyl motif from aldehydes, carboxylic acids, and formates. These examples typically employ Rhodium as the organometallic transition metal, as it is commonly used in decarbonylation reactions. The decarbonylation and PKR occur in the same reaction vessel.

Stable cobalt complexes 
Canonical PKR utilizes low-valent cobalt, however, these complexes are typically unstable, and efforts have been focused on preparing low-valent cobalt from bench (and generally) more stable cobalt complexes. Chung reported a catalytic PKR utilizing Co(acac)2, where upon exposure to sodium borohydride (NaBH4), generates the active catalytic species.

Multinuclear cobalt catalysts 
Generally, multinuclear cobalt catalysts like (Co)4(CO)12 and Co3(CO)9(μ3-CH) have been explored, however these complexes readily undergo oligomerization and often require harsh conditions.

Takayama and co-workers used an intramolecular Pauson–Khand reaction to cyclise an enyne containing a tert-butyldiphenylsilyl (TBDPS) protected primary alcohol.  This was a key step in the asymmetric total synthesis of the Lycopodium alkaloid huperzine-Q.  The inclusion of a cyclic siloxane moiety in the reagent ensures that the product is formed with the desired conformation – only a single enantiomer of the product was obtained in the Pauson–Khand reaction sequence.

Variations 
Wilkinson's catalyst, based on the transition metal rhodium, also effectively catalyses PK reactions but requires silver triflate as a co-catalyst.

Molybdenum hexacarbonyl is a carbon monoxide donor in PK-type reactions between allenes and alkynes with dimethyl sulfoxide in toluene. In general allenes can work in PKR. One example below is with molybdenum, however rhodium gives different regioselectivity. DFT investigations show the differences in selectivity are due to the different transition state metal geometries.

The total synthesis of physostigmine by the Mukai group utilized the PKR on a carbodiimide.

Cyclobutadiene also lends itself to a [2+2+1] cycloaddition although this reactant is generated in situ from decomplexation of stable cyclobutadiene iron tricarbonyl with ceric ammonium nitrate (CAN).

An example of a newer version is the use of the chlorodicarbonylrhodium(I) dimer, [(CO)2RhCl]2, in the synthesis of (+)-phorbol by Phil Baran. In addition to using a rhodium catalyst, this synthesis features an intramolecular cyclization that results in the normal 5-membered α,β-cyclopentenone as well as 7-membered ring.

See also 
 Nicholas reaction

References

Further reading 
For Khand and Pauson's perspective on the reaction:
 
 
 

For a modern perspective:
 
 
 

On specifically catalytic versions of the reaction:
 

Cycloadditions
Multiple component reactions
Name reactions